Acer wilsonii, (in , meaning "Three Gorges maple"), is a species of flowering plant in the genus Acer, native to southeast and south-central China. It is considered by some authorities to be a subspecies of Campbell's maple, Acer campbellii subsp. wilsonii, but this is incorrect; it is in its own species complex. A tree typically 10 to 15m tall, it prefers to grow in forests 900 to 2000m above sea level.

References

wilsonii
Trees of China
Endemic flora of China
Plants described in 1905